Kupp is a surname. Notable people with the surname include the following family of American football players:

Jake Kupp (born 1941), offensive lineman
Craig Kupp (born 1967), Jake's son; quarterback
Cooper Kupp (born 1993), Craig's son; wide receiver

See also
Cupp (surname)